The Corpus Christi Yacht Club is an American private yacht club located in Corpus Christi, Texas which belongs to the Texas Sailing Association.

History 
The club was incorporated on November 13, 1923. In 1950, it merged with the Southwestern Yacht Club. The two clubs had been the most active racing clubs in Corpus Christi. CCSC's first regatta, a 12 boat Snipe competition, took place June 15 and 16, 1946. In this class, Billy Wicker, commodore of the Southwestern Yacht Club, and Robert Vetters won the United States Snipe National Championship, hosted at the club in 1948.

CCYC hosted the Optimist World Championship in 2002, and the Melges 24 World Championship in 2011.

Notes

References

External links 
 Official website

1923 establishments in Texas
Sailing in Texas
Sports in Corpus Christi, Texas
Yacht clubs in the United States